The Net (a.k.a. Project M7 (U.S. distribution)) is a 1953 British aviation thriller film made by Two Cities Films, directed by Anthony Asquith and starring James Donald, Phyllis Calvert, Robert Beatty and Herbert Lom.  The film is set in the world of aviation research and was based on the 1952 novel of the same name by John Pudney.

Plot
At "Port Amberley", a secret aviation research station somewhere in England, a group of scientists are working on the prototype of a revolutionary new aircraft, a supersonic nuclear-augmented jet aircraft code-named M7, taking off and landing on water and capable of flying at up to 2,000 miles per hour. The project is intended to lead to M8, a spacecraft to explore space.

The atmosphere at the laboratory is competitive rather than co-operative, with rivalry between the various scientists.  The project leader Michael Heathley (James Donald) is so wrapped up with the M7 that his wife Lydia (Phyllis Calvert) feels neglected and that she is being sidelined in favour of her husband's work.  At a social gathering, she strikes up a conversation with Heathley's colleague Alex Leon (Herbert Lom), and the pair are soon circling one another.

Meanwhile, Heathley is desperate to test the M7, but is over-ruled by facility director Carrington (Maurice Denham). The M7 is finally given its first test flight, and a perilous situation is only just survived. The group continue to work on modifications to iron out minor problems identified on the test flight. Matters take a sinister turn when Carrington dies after an accident. Meanwhile, the project's security members strongly suspect there is a spy in their midst and deploy agents to follow the scientists when away from the station.

The finished version of the M7 then takes to the sky, along with the spy who has talked his way on board. The spy tries to hijack the aircraft, but is foiled by pilot Heathley.

Cast

 James Donald as Michael Heathley
 Phyllis Calvert as Lydia Heathley
 Robert Beatty as Sam Seagram
 Herbert Lom as Alex Leon
 Noel Willman as Dennis Bord
 Maurice Denham as Carrington
 Muriel Pavlow as Caroline Cartier
 Walter Fitzgerald as Sir Charles Craddock
 Patric Doonan as Brian Jackson
 Marjorie Fielding as Mother Heathley
 Herbert Lomas as George Jackson
 Cyril Chamberlain as Inspector Carter
 Hal Osmond as Agent Lawson
 Marianne Stone as Maisie
 Geoffrey Denton as Fisher

Production
Although The Net deals with contemporary aviation technology, there are no aircraft to be seen, other than photographs on walls and a model of the top-secret delta-wing M7 aircraft. At one point, the aircraft is seen resting on water, giving it the potential of being a flying-boat. All the interiors of the M7 are studio-constructed mock-ups.

At least one take-off from water of the M7 is shown using special effects. The waterborne segment simply shows the increasing slipstream effect on water to the rear of the craft as it increases speed, with no view of the M7 itself. The airborne segment is viewed from several ground locations showing either the M7 zooming overhead or the M7's shadow.

Reception
Aviation Historian Michael Paris, in From the Wright Brothers to Top Gun: Aviation, Nationalism, and Popular Cinema (1995) was positive in his review of the film. "The Net is essentially a thriller owing a great deal to contemporary Cold War tensions, but interestingly, it still pays homage to the notion of progress and utopianism through aviation and suggests that Britain is in the forefront of space research."

In Aviation in the Cinema (1985), aviation film historian Stephen Pendo, however, considered The Net, "... a poor effort; its only distinction is that it was the first aviation film to be photographed in Technicolor 3 D."

References

Notes

Citations

Bibliography

 Paris, Michael. From the Wright Brothers to Top Gun: Aviation, Nationalism, and Popular Cinema. Manchester, UK: Manchester University Press, 1995. .
 Pendo, Stephen. Aviation in the Cinema. Lanham, Maryland: Scarecrow Press, 1985. .
 Skogsberg, Bertil. Wings on the Screen: A Pictorial History of Air Movies. London: Tantivy Press, 1987. .

External links
 
 
 

1953 films
British drama films
British aviation films
British black-and-white films
Two Cities Films films
Films shot at Pinewood Studios
Films directed by Anthony Asquith
Films scored by Benjamin Frankel
Films based on British novels
Films set in England
British thriller films
1950s thriller films
1950s English-language films
1950s British films